Nordic combined at the 1976 Winter Olympics, consisted of one event, held from 8 February to 9 February at Seefeld.

Medal summary

Medal table

Germany won all three medals, with the East Germans topping the table with two and West Germany winning the third.

Events

Individual

Athletes did three normal hill ski jumps, with the lowest score dropped. They then raced a 15 kilometre cross-country course, with the time converted to points. The athlete with the highest combined points score was awarded the gold medal.

Participating NOCs

Fourteen nations participated in nordic combined at the Innsbruck Games.

References

External links
Sports-Reference - 1976 Olympics - Nordic Combined
Sports-Reference - 1976 Olympics - Nordic Combined - Individual

 
1976 Winter Olympics events
1976
1976 in Nordic combined
Nordic combined competitions in Austria
Men's events at the 1976 Winter Olympics